Peter Glans (born 5 January 1993) is a Danish long-distance runner.

In 2017, he competed in the senior men's race at the 2017 IAAF World Cross Country Championships held in Kampala, Uganda. He finished in 85th place.

In 2019, he competed in the senior men's race at the 2019 IAAF World Cross Country Championships held in Aarhus, Denmark. He finished in 94th place.

References

External links 
 

Living people
1993 births
Place of birth missing (living people)
Danish male long-distance runners
Danish male cross country runners